The Patronal Medal is awarded jointly by The Catholic University of America and the Basilica of the National Shrine of the Immaculate Conception.  It is awarded someone who has "rendered distinguished service in the advancement of Marian devotion, theology, or general appreciation of the place of Mary in the life of the Catholic Church."

It is awarded on an occasional basis around December 8, the Feast of the Immaculate Conception, the Patronal feast of Catholic University and the Basilica.  It was awarded 25 times between its establishment in 1974 and 2010.

Winners

See also

 List of religion-related awards

References

Catholic University of America
Catholic ecclesiastical decorations
Mary, mother of Jesus